Mertensiidae is a family of ctenophores belonging to the order Cydippida.

Genera:
 Callianira Péron & Lesueur, 1808
 Charistephane Chun, 1879
 Gastrodes Korotneff, 1888
 Mertensia Lesson, 1830

References

Tentaculata